Courtesan at her Mirror or Young Woman with Earrings is a 1657 painting by Rembrandt. In 1781 it and 118 other works were sold by the Paris-based collector Sylvain-Raphaël de Baudouin to Catherine II of Russia via Melchior Grimm. It is now in the Hermitage Museum.

Sources
https://www.hermitagemuseum.org/wps/portal/hermitage/digital-collection/01.+Paintings/43544/

1657 paintings
Paintings by Rembrandt
Paintings in the collection of the Hermitage Museum